An oboist (formerly hautboist) is a musician who plays the oboe or any oboe family instrument, including the oboe d'amore, cor anglais or English horn, bass oboe and piccolo oboe or oboe musette.

The following is a list of notable past and present professional oboists, with indications when they were/are known better for other professions in their own time. Oboists with an asterisk (*) have biographies in the online version of the Grove Dictionary of Music and Musicians.

Historical oboists

Baroque period 1600–1760 

 Francesco Barsanti (1690–1772), Italian * (composer)
 Alessandro Besozzi (1702–1773), Italian
 Antonio Besozzi (1714–1781), Italian
 Cristoforo Besozzi (1661–1725), Italian
 Giuseppe Besozzi (1686–1760), Italian
 Paolo Girolamo Besozzi (1713–1778), Italian
 Mateo Bissoli (Bisioli) (–1780), Italian
 Esprit Philippe Chédeville (1696–1762), French *
 Nicolas Chédeville (1705–1782), French *
 Pierre Chédeville (1694–1725), French *
 André Danican Philidor (c. 1652–1730), French * (music librarian)
 Anne Danican Philidor (1681–1728), French
 Jean Danican Philidor (–1679), French
  (1580–1651), French
  (1681–1731), French
 John Ernest Galliard (–1747), German *
 Johann Caspar Gleditsch (1684–1747), German ("Bach's oboist")
 Peter Glösch (–1754), German
 Jean Hotteterre (–1691), French * (instrument maker) (one of several oboists in the family)
 Martin Hotteterre (1635–1712), French * (instrument maker)
 Nicolas Hotteterre (1637–1694), French *
 Johann Christian Jacobi (1719–1784), German (oboist at Janitsch's "Freitags-Akademien")
 Jean Christian Kytch (died ), Dutch ("Handel's oboist")
 François La Riche (1662 – after 1733), Flemish *
 Jacques Loeillet (1685–1748), Flemish *
 Jean-Baptiste Loeillet (1680–1730), Flemish *
 Jacques Paisible (–1721), French (oboist in Robert Cambert orchestra which moved to London in 1673) 
 Joan Baptista Pla (–1773), Spanish *
 Josep Pla (1728–1762), Spanish *
 Manuel Pla (–1766), Spanish *
 Giovanni Benedetto Platti (1697–1763), Italian *
 Johann Christian Richter (1689–1744), German
 Jacob Riehman (–1729), Dutch *
 Giuseppe Sammartini (1695–1750), Italian * (son of French oboist Alexis Saint-Martin)
 Georg Philipp Telemann (1681–1767), German composer (Oboe was one of over 10 instruments he played)
 Roberto Valentine (1674 – ), English * (composer)

Classical period 1730–1820 

 Sante Aguilar (–1808), Italian
 Christian Frederik Barth (1787–1861), Danish
 Christian Samuel Barth (1735–1809), German *
 Frederik Philip Carl August Barth (1774–1804), Danish *
 Georg Benda (1722–1795), Czech * (composer)
 Carlo Besozzi (1738–1791), Italian
 Francesco Besozzi (1766–1816), Italian
 Gaetano Besozzi (1725–1794), Italian
 Girolamo Besozzi (–1788), Italian
 Friedrich Braun (1759–1824), German *
 Franz Joseph Czerwenka (1759–1835), Czech-Austrian ("Beethoven's oboist")
 Georg Druschetzky (1745–1819), Czech *
 Giuseppe Ferlendis (1755–1810), Italian  *
 Josef Fiala (1748–1816), Czech * ("Mozart's oboist 1")
 Johann Christian Fischer (1733–1800), German *
 Joseph François Garnier (1755–1825), French *
 Michel Joseph Gebauer (1763–1812), French *
 Gottlieb Graupner (1767–1836), German-American
 William Herschel (1738–1822), German (astronomer) (before 1765 primarily oboist, only later an astronomer)
 François Jadin (1731–1790), French *
 Carl Khym (1770–after 1819), Czech *
 Ludwig August Lebrun (1746–1790), German *
 Ignace Malzat (1757–1804), Austrian (probably wrote the "Haydn" oboe concerto) *
  (–1804), Italian *
 Carl Ludwig Matthes (1751–?), German
 John Parke (1745–1829), English *
 William Thomas Parke (1762–1847), English *
 Giuseppe Prota (1737–1807), Italian *
 Friedrich Ramm (1744–1813), German ("Mozart's oboist 2")
 François Alexandre Antoine Sallantin (1755 – ), French *
 Johann Friedrich Schröter (1724–1811), German *
 Charles J. Suck (–), English *
 Philipp Teimer (Filip Matyas Tajmar) (1767–1817), Bohemian (English horn)
 Georg Triebensee (1746–1813), Bohemian *
 Josef Triebensee (1772–1846), Bohemian * (composer)
  (1745–1801), Bohemian *
 Thomas Vincent (1720–1783), English *

Romantic period 1815–1910 

 Apollon Barret (1804–1879), French *
 Christian Frederik Barth (1787–1861), Danish *
 Richard Baumgärtel (1858–1941), German
 Félix-Charles Berthélemy (1829–1868), French
 Carl A.P. Braun (1788–1835), German *
 Wilhelm Braun (1796–1867), German *
 Henri Brod (1799–1839), French *
 Baldassare Centroni (–1860), Italian ("Rossini's oboist")
  (1832–1881), French
 Franz Wilhelm Ferling (1796–1874), German
 (1909–1971), German 
 Georges Gillet (1854–1920), French *
 Joseph Gungl (1810–1889), Hungarian * (conductor)
 Johann Peter Heuschkel (1773–1853), German *
 Ernst Krähmer (1795–1857), German * 
 Olivo Krause (1857–1927), Danish
 Desiré Alfred Lalande (1866–1904), French *
 Antoine Joseph Lavigne (1816–1886), French
 Johann Heinrich Luft (1813–1877), German
 William Malsch (1855–1924), English *
 Giovanni Paggi (1806–1887), Italian *
 Antonio Pasculli (1842–1924), Italian * (the "Paganini of the oboe")
 Charles Reynolds (1843–1916), English
 Friedrich Ruthardt (1800–1862), German 
 Adolf Rzepko (1825–1892), Polish *
 Joseph Sellner (1787–1843), Austrian
 Pedro Soler (1810–1850), Spanish
 Friedrich-Eugen Thurner (1785–1827), German
 Charles Triébert (1810–1867), French *
 Frédéric Triébert (1813–1878), French * (instrument maker)
 Raoul Triébert (1845–), French *
 Stanislas Verroust (1814–1863), French
 Gustave Vogt (1781–1870), French *
 Friedrich Westenholz (1778–1840), German *
 Carlo Yvon (1798–1854), Italian

20th-century oboists

A-L
 Albert J. Andraud (1884–1975), French-American
 Rhadames Angelucci (1915–1991), American
 Alfred Barthel (1871–1957), French
 Evelyn Barbirolli (born Evelyn Rothwell), (1911–2008), English *
 Louis Bas (1863–1944), French 
 Etienne Baudo (1903–2001), French
  (1871–1941), French
 Robert Bloom (1908–1994), American *
 Joy Boughton (1913–1963), English
 Leonard Brain (1915–1975), English *
 Henri de Busscher (1880–1975), Belgian *
 Natalie Caine (1909–2008), English
  (1932–1984), French
 Janet Craxton (1929–1981), English * (Sister of the painter John Craxton)
 William Criss (1921–1984), American
 John de Lancie (1921–2002), American *
 Albert Debondue (1895–1984), French
 Antonio Estévez (1916–1988), Venezuelan * (composer)
 Alvin Etler (1913–1973), American * (composer)
 Svend Christian Felumb (1898–1972), Danish
 Peter Fischer (1924–2004), German 
 Fritz Flemming (born 1872 or 1873; died 1947), German
 (1905–1984), Canadian
 Bert Gassman (1911–2004), American
 Fernand Gillet (1882–1980), French
 Ruth Gipps (1921–1999), British (composer)
 Albert Goltzer (1918–2007), American
 Harold Gomberg (1916–1985), American *
 Ralph Gomberg (1921–2006), American *
 Leon Goossens (1897–1988), English *
 Peter Graeme (1921–2012), English
 Percy Grainger (1882–1961), Australian-American
  (1910–1990), Czech *
 Earnest Harrison (1918–2005), American
 Hans Kamesch (1901–1975), Austrian
 Rudolf Kempe (1910–1976), German * (conductor)
 Bruno Labate (1883–1968), Italian
 Roland Lamorlette (1894–1960), French
 Alfred Läubin (1906–1976), American (instrument maker)
 Marc Lifschey (1926–2000), American
 Georges Longy (1868–1930), French *

M-Z
 Terence MacDonagh (1908–1986), British
 Arno Mariotti (1911–1993), German-born American
 Josef Marx (1913–1978), German-American *
 Robert Mayer (1910–1994), American
 Karl Mayrhofer (1927–1976), Austrian
 Mitch Miller (1911–2010), American (choir conductor, recording director)
 Myrtile Morel (1889–1979), French
  (1904–1983), American
 Pierre Pierlot (1921–2007), French
 Giuseppe Prestini (1877–1930), Italian
 David Reichenberg (1950–1987), American * (also listed under period instrumentalists below)
 A. Clyde Roller (1914–2005), American
 Marcel Saillet (1898–1983), Swiss 
 Jürg Schaeftlein (1929–1986), Austrian *
 Riccardo Scozzi (1878–1955), Italian
 Edgar Shann (1919–1984), Swiss
 Harry Shulman (1916–1971), American
 Jerry Sirucek (1922–1996), American
  (1922–1995), Dutch
 Václav Smetáček (1906–1986), Czech * (conductor)
 Robert Sprenkle (1914–1988), American
 Warren Stannard (1923–1995), American 
 William Grant Still (1895–1978), American * (composer)
  (1915–1964), Dutch *
 Jaap Stotijn (1891–1970), Dutch *
 František Suchý (1902–1977), Czech *
 Sidney Sutcliffe (1918–2001), Scottish
  (1922–2008), Japanese 
 Marcel Tabuteau (1887–1966), French/American *
 Jiří Tancibudek (1921–2004), Czech-Australian 
 Giuseppe Tomassini (1915–1987), Italian
 Lois Wann (1912–1999), American
 Alexander Wunderer (1877–1955), Austrian

20th-century players of the English horn

 Engelbert Brenner (1904–1986), Austrian- born American
 Harry Freedman (1922–2005), Polish-born Canadian (composer)
 Hans Hadamowsky (1906–1986), Austrian
 Peter Henkelman (1882–1949), Dutch
 Leo van der Lek (1908–1999), Dutch
 John Minsker (1912–2007), American
 Louis Speyer (1890–1980), French-born American

Contemporary classical oboists

A-B
 Janice Applegate (born 1948), American
Aurel Marc, Romanian
 Max Artved (born 1965), Danish
 Theodore Baskin (born 1950), American
 Perry Bauman (1918–2004), American-Canadian
 William Bennett (1956–2013), American
 Melvin Berman (1929–2008), American-Canadian
  (1929–2020), Uruguayan *
 Neil Black (1932–2016), English
 Maurice Bourgue (born 1939), French
 Peter Bowman, American
 Douglas Boyd (born 1960), Scottish
 Peter Bree (born 1949), Dutch
 Riccardo Bricchi (born 1959), Italian

C-E

 German Cáceres (born 1954), Salvadoran * (composer)
 George Caird (born c. 1950), English
 Sandro Caldini (born 1958), Italian
 Anthony Camden (1938–2006), English
 Roy Carter (born 1949), English
 Joseph Celli (born 1944), American *
 Nicholas Daniel (born 1962), English
 Clara Dent (born 1973), German (daughter of Simon Dent) 
 (born 1972), Australian 
 Paolo Di Cioccio (born 1963), Italian
 Jonathan Dlouhy, American
 Diana Doherty (born 1966), Australian
 Elaine Douvas (born 1952), American
 Stuart Edward Dunkel, American
 Niels Eje (born 1954), Danish
 Majid Entezami (born 1947), Iranian

F-H
 John Ferrillo, American
  (born 1938), English *
 Thomas Gallant, American
 Alfred Genovese (1931–2011), American
 Ariana Ghez (born 1979), American
 Burkhard Glaetzner (born 1943), German
 Wynne Godley (1926–2010), English (economist)
 Henrik Chaim Goldschmidt (born 1959), Danish 
 Ingo Goritzki (born 1939), German
 Charles Hamann (born 1971), American-Canadian
  (born 1965), German 
 Jared Hauser (born 1971), American
 (born 1940), Dutch 
 Brynjar Hoff (born 1940), Norwegian
 Heinz Holliger (born 1939), Swiss *
 Bernd Holz (born 1955), German
 Christian Hommel (born 1963), German
 Gordon Hunt (born 1950), English

I-L

  (born 1951), Swiss
 Eugene Izotov (born 1973), Russian-American
 Florin Ionoaia (born 1956), Romanian
 Jean-Claude Jaboulay, French
 Helen Jahren (born 1959), Swedish
 Kamil Jalilov (1938–2022), Azerbaijani 
 Arthur Jensen (1925–2018), American
 Giorgi Kalandarishvili (born 1983) Georgian-German. Muenster Symphony, University of Music in Muenster "Musikhochschule Münster"
 Michael Kamen (1948–2003), American (film score composer)
 Melvin Kaplan (born 1929), American
 Jonathan Kelly (born 1969), British 
 Dimitris Kitsos (born 1971), Greek
 Alex Klein (born 1964), Brazilian
 Elizabeth Koch (born 1986), American 
 Lothar Koch (1935–2003), German *
  (born ), Estonian
 Yeon-Hee Kwak (born ), Korean
 François Leleux (born 1971), French
  (born 1943), Hungarian
 Jay Light (born 1940s), American
 Michael Lisicky (born 1964), American

M-Q

 John Mack (1927–2006), American
 Charles Mackerras (1925–2010), Australian (conductor) *

 Jean-Claude Malgoire (1940–2018), French
 Joel Marangella (born 1940s), American
 Eldevina Materula (born 1982), Mozambican
 Albrecht Mayer (born 1965), German
 Malcolm Messiter, English 
 Fumiaki Miyamoto (born 1949) 宮本文昭, Japanese
 Lucas Macías Navarro (born 1978), Spanish 
 Katherine Needleman (born 1978), American 
 (born 1978), Russian 
 Christopher O'Neal (born 1953), British 
  (born 1967), Dutch 
 Ivan Podyomov, (born 1986), Russian
  (1918–2010), Russian

R-S

 Wayne Rapier (1930–2005), American 
 Elizabeth Raum (born 1945), Canadian * 
 Sally Sarah Johnston Reid (born 1948), American *
 Juozas Rimas (born 1942), Lithuanian
 Roger Roe (born 1968), American, assistant principal oboist/English horn player of the Indianapolis Symphony Orchestra
 Carlo Romano (born 1954), Italian 
 Joseph Robinson (born 1940), American *
 Pierre Rolland (1931–2011), Canadian
 Ronald Roseman (1933–2000), American 
 Edwin Roxburgh (born 1937), English *
 Telena Ruth (born 1957), Australian 
 Graham Salter, English 
 Hansjorg Schellenberger (born 1948), German 
 Bernard Schenkel (born 1941), Swiss 
 Bart Schneemann (born 1954), Dutch 
  (born 1970), German 
 Martin Schuring (American) 
 Jonathan Small (born 1956), English 
 Peter Smith, American
 Jan Spronk (born ), Dutch 
 Eva Steinaa (born 1993), Danish
 Ray Still (1920–2014), American
 Cynthia Steljes (1960–2006), Canadian 
 Daniel Stolper (1935–2020), American
 Laila Storch (1921–2022), American 
 Linda Strommen (born 1957), American

T-Z
 Blair Tindall (born 1960), American (author)
 Jacques Tys, French 
 Alexei Utkin (born 1957), Russian 
  (born 1963), Belgian 
 Allan Vogel (born 1944), American
 Han de Vries (born 1941), Dutch * 
 Edo de Waart (born 1941), Dutch * (conductor)
  (born 1958), French 
 Liang Wang (born 1980) 王亮, Chinese 

 Mark Weiger (1959–2008), American 
 Judith Weir (born 1954), Scottish (composer) * 
 Helmut Winschermann (1920–2021), German (conductor) 
 Richard Woodhams (born 1949), American 
 Renato Zanfini, Italian 
 Omar Zoboli (born 1953), Italian

Contemporary oboists best known for playing English horn (cor anglais) or oboe d'amore 
 Russ deLuna (born 1969), American 
 Jennifer Paull (born 1944), English (oboe d'amore) 
 Christine Pendrill, English 
 Louis Rosenblatt (1928–2009), American 
 Grover Schiltz (1931–2012), American 
 Thomas Stacy (born 1938), American *

Contemporary oboists best known for playing period instruments 

 Katharina Arfken, German 
 Paul Dombrecht (born 1948), Belgian 
 Ku Ebbinge (born 1948), Dutch *
 Paul Goodwin (born 1956), English * 
 Bruce Haynes (1942–2011), American-Canadian *
  (born 1943), Japanese (conductor) 
 Christopher Palameta (born 1979), Canadian
 Michel Piguet (1932–2004), Swiss *
 Marcel Ponseele (born 1957), Belgian 
 Susanne Regel (born 1974), German
 David Reichenberg (1950–1987), American * 
 Hugo Reyne (born 1961), French 
 Anthony Robson (born 1955), English 
 Marc Schachman, American

Oboists performing primarily outside classical genres

As primary instrument 
 Kyle Bruckmann (born 1971), American – free improvisation
 Lindsay Cooper (1951–2013), English – art rock
 Jean-Luc Fillon (born 1960s), French – jazz
 Karl Jenkins (born 1944), Welsh * – jazz
 Colin Maier (born 1976), Canadian – new classical, celtic 
 Paul McCandless (born 1947), American * – jazz
 Nancy Rumbel (born 1951), American – new age
 Sonny Simmons (1933–2021), American – jazz
 Frank Socolow (1923–1981), American – jazz
 Kate St John (born 1957), English – art rock, pop
 Libby Van Cleve (born 1958), American – avant garde
 Russel Walder (born 1959), American – new age

As secondary instrument
 Ahmad Alaadeen (1934–2010), American – jazz (saxophonist)
 Marshall Allen (born 1924), American – jazz (saxophonist)
 Derek Bell (1935–2002), Irish – folk (harpist)
 Amanda Brown (born 1965), Australian – indie rock (violinist, guitarist)
 Garvin Bushell (1902–1991), American – jazz (all reeds)
 Bob Cooper (1925–1993), American – jazz (saxophone)
 Julie Fowlis (born 1979), Scottish – Celtic (vocalist)
 Vinny Golia (born 1946), American – jazz (all woodwinds)
 Joseph Jarman (1937–2019), American – jazz (clarinetist, saxophonist)
 Mick Karn (1958–2011), British – rock (multi-instrumentalist)
 Rahsaan Roland Kirk (1936–1977), American – jazz (multi-instrumentalist)
 Yusef Lateef (1920–2013), American – jazz (saxophonist, flutist)
 Giuseppi Logan (1935–2020), American – jazz (multi-instrumentalist)
 Andy Mackay (born 1946), English – art rock (saxophonist)
 Charlie Mariano (1923–2009), American – jazz (saxophonist)
 Makanda Ken McIntyre (1931–2001), American – jazz (saxophonist)
 Roscoe Mitchell (born 1940), American – jazz (saxophonist)
 Dewey Redman (1931–2006), American – jazz (saxophonist, suona)
 Don Redman (1900–1964), American – jazz (clarinetist, saxophonist)
 Sufjan Stevens (born 1975), American – indie rock (multi-instrumentalist)
 Kjartan Sveinsson (born 1978), Icelandic – post-rock (keyboardist)

Shehnai players 

 Ali Ahmed Hussain Khan (1939–2016), Indian
 Bismillah Khan (1916–2006), Indian
 S. Ballesh (born 1958), Indian

References

Further reading
 David Lasocki "The French Hautboy in England, 1673–1730" Early Music 16(3) 339–357
 Alfredo Bernardini "The Oboe in the Venetian Republic, 1692–1797" Early Music 16(3) 372–387
 Janet K. Page "The Hautboy in London's Musical Life, 1730–1770" Early Music 16(3) 358–371
 Bruce Haynes "Mozart and the Oboe" Early Music 20(1) 43–63
 
 Ryoichi Narusawa (ed. Marc Fink) "A History of Oboe Playing in Japan" (The Double Reed, Vol.27 No.4, International Double Reed Society) 2004

External links

 The New Grove Dictionary of Music and Musicians 
 International Double Reed Society website
 The repertory of the oboe soloist in the 19th century
 Exhaustive list of active double-reed musicians at oboeinsight.com
 Important people in oboe history

Oboists